The Reconciliation of European Histories Group is an informal all-party group in the European Parliament involved in promoting the Prague Process in all of Europe, aimed at coming to terms with the totalitarian past in many countries of Europe. The group is chaired by former European Commissioner Sandra Kalniete and comprises members of the European People's Party, the Alliance of Liberals and Democrats, The Greens–European Free Alliance, the Progressive Alliance of Socialists and Democrats, Europe of Freedom and Democracy, and the European Conservatives and Reformists. As of 2011, the group had 40 members, including Sandra Kalniete, Hans-Gert Pöttering (Chairman of the Konrad Adenauer Foundation and former President of the European Parliament), László Tőkés (Vice President of the European Parliament), Heidi Hautala (former Chair of the Subcommittee on Human Rights), and Gunnar Hökmark (Chairman of the European Friends of Israel). The group has co-hosted a number of public hearings and other meetings in the European Parliament on totalitarianism and communist crimes in Eastern and Central Europe. The Reconciliation of European Histories Group also cooperates closely with the Working Group on the Platform of European Memory and Conscience.

According to historian Mano Toth, "in practice the informal group has become completely dominated by the agenda of the anti‐communist group" and subscribes to the theory that Nazi and Communist crimes are morally equivalent. Toth also states that most of the participants of the group are right-wing politicians from Eastern Europe who are known for anti-Communist stance.

Members

Bastiaan Belder, EFD
Kinga Gál, PPE
Cristina Gutierrez-Cortines, PPE
Ágnes Hankiss, PPE
Heidi Hautala, Greens/EFA
Gunnar Hökmark, PPE
Anneli Jäätteenmäki, ALDE
Philippe Juvin, PPE
Sandra Kalniete, PPE
Arturs Krišjānis Kariņš, PPE
Tunne Kelam, PPE
Andrey Kovatchev, PPE
Alain Lamassoure, PPE
Vytautas Landsbergis, PPE
Monica Luisa Macovei, PPE
Iosif Matula, PPE
Marek Migalski, ECR
Radvilė Morkūnaitė, PPE
Mariya Ivanova Nedelcheva, PPE
Kristiina Ojuland, ALDE
Ivari Padar, S&D
Bernd Posselt, PPE
Hans-Gert Pöttering, PPE
Cristian Dan Preda, PPE
Zuzana Roithová, PPE
Jacek Saryusz-Wolski, PPE
György Schöpflin, PPE
Sógor Csaba, PPE
Peter Šťastný, PPE
Theodor Stolojan, PPE
László Surján, PPE
József Szájer, PPE
Csaba Tabajdi, S&D
László Tőkés, PPE
Traian Ungureanu, PPE
Viktor Uspaskich, ALDE
Inese Vaidere, PPE
Anna Záborská, PPE 
Paweł Zalewski, PPE
Milan Zver, PPE

References

External links
Official site

European Parliament
Prague Declaration on European Conscience and Communism